Charles Bonney (31 October 1813 – 15 March 1897) was a pioneer and politician in Australia.

Early life
Bonney was the youngest son of the Rev. George Bonney, a fellow of Jesus College, Cambridge, and his wife Susanna, née Knight. He was born at Sandon, Staffordshire, England. After his father died in 1826 his brother Thomas, headmaster of Rugeley Grammar School, gave him an education and a home for seven years. (Two of Thomas's sons, Edward and Frederic Bonney, later went to Australia.)

Pioneering in Australia
Bonney left Britain on 5 August 1834 in the John Craig and arrived at Sydney on 12 December 1834, where he became clerk to Mr Justice Burton. About 18 months later he went with Charles Ebden to the Murray River around the present site of Albury, New South Wales. In December 1836, he crossed the Murray and took cattle to Port Phillip District, having been preceded by only Gardiner and Joseph Hawdon. On 1 March 1837 he was the first to overland sheep, bringing some 10,000 belonging to Ebden to Sugarloaf Creek, Victoria station a tributary of the Goulburn River. This was up to twenty times a typical ship load of sheep, eliminated catastrophic losses of entire ship loads and transformed the economics of the wool industry in Victoria as other overlanders followed his path. On about 21 March 1837 he discovered the rich, fertile Kilmore Plains in a journey that included blazing the trail of the Sydney Road. Kilmore became the inland agricultural powerhouse of the infant State of Victoria. These discoveries had a major impact on the economy of Victoria. p108 p117.  Bonney later wrote that amongst his proudest achievements were founding the fertile district of Kilmore and the route of the Sydney Road. In January 1838, acting as overseer to Joseph Hawdon, he went with him and a party with about 300 cattle, from the Murray, near Albury, to Adelaide. It was the hottest season of the year, and groups of aborigines were continually being encountered, but the party kept on good terms with them by Bonney using the unique and peaceful process of playing his flute for them. On 1 March 1838 they came to the junction of the Darling River with the Murray, and the whole journey took about three months. A beautiful lake was found on 4 March and named after the young Queen Victoria, and on 12 March another lake was found and named by Hawdon after Bonney – see Lake Bonney Riverland. They left the Murray on 23 March, and after travelling many miles, Mount Barker was reached. About 1 April they reached the seashore near where the township of Noarlunga now stands. Meeting some settlers, they made for Adelaide, where they arrived on 3 April and found a ready market for their cattle. Returning to Port Phillip by sea, Bonney brought another herd of cattle overland to Adelaide in February 1839, travelling through south-west Victoria rather than following the River Murray, a longer but safer route. Near the border the country became very dry, and disaster was narrowly averted. Fortunately water was found, and when the Murray was crossed only one bullock and one horse were lost. In spite of their difficulties, only 23 cattle were lost on the whole journey (Edward John Eyre, who had taken a similar route around the time of Hawdon and Bonney's first cattle drive, had not been so fortunate). He was a member of O'Halloran's 1840 punitive expedition following the massacre of survivors of the wreck of the Maria. Bonney stayed at Adelaide for a time and then joined Ebden again at the Murray. In 1841 a period of depression led to cattle becoming almost unsaleable.

Political career
In 1842 Bonney became a magistrate and commissioner of crown lands in South Australia. He held this position for about 15 years. When responsible government came in, Bonney was elected a member of the South Australian House of Assembly for East Torrens, and became commissioner of crown lands in the first ministry under B. T. Finniss. This ministry went out of office in August 1857 and Bonney resigned his seat in the following January. He was in England from 1858 to 1862, and returning to South Australia, was elected to the South Australian Legislative Council in 1865, retiring in 1866. In 1861 he was elected a fellow of the Royal Geographical Society. From 1869 to 1871 he was manager of the South Australian railways. In 1871 he was appointed inspector of lands purchased on credit, and in 1880 retired on a pension. In 1885 he went to Sydney and died there, at his residence, "Thornley", Woollahra, on 15 March 1897. He had been afflicted with blindness for some years. He left a widow, Charlotte (died 20 September 1902), two sons and three daughters.

See also
 French Australian

Notes

References
H. J. Gibbney, 'Bonney, Charles (1813 - 1897)', Australian Dictionary of Biography, Volume 3, Melbourne University Press, 1969, pp 188–190.

Further reading
 

1813 births
1897 deaths
Explorers of South Australia
Settlers of South Australia
Members of the South Australian House of Assembly
Members of the South Australian Legislative Council
19th-century Australian politicians
Mayors of places in South Australia
English emigrants to colonial Australia